The Nexus for Exoplanet System Science (NExSS) initiative is a National Aeronautics and Space Administration (NASA) virtual institute designed to foster interdisciplinary collaboration in the search for life on  exoplanets. Led by the Ames Research Center, the NASA Exoplanet Science Institute, and the Goddard Institute for Space Studies, NExSS will help organize the search for life on exoplanets from participating research teams and acquire new knowledge about exoplanets and extrasolar planetary systems.

History

In 1995, astronomers using ground-based observatories discovered 51 Pegasi b, the first exoplanet orbiting a Sun-like star. NASA launched the Kepler space telescope in 2009 to search for Earth-size exoplanets. By 2015, they had confirmed more than a thousand exoplanets, while several thousand additional candidates awaited confirmation.

To help coordinate efforts to sift through and understand the data, NASA needed a way for researchers to collaborate across disciplines.  The success of the Virtual Planetary Laboratory research network at the University of Washington led Mary A. Voytek, director of the NASA Astrobiology Program, to model its structure and create the Nexus for Exoplanet System Science (NExSS) initiative. Leaders from three NASA research centers will run the program:  Natalie Batalha of NASA's Ames Research Center, Dawn Gelino of the NASA Exoplanet Science Institute, and Anthony Del Genio of NASA's Goddard Institute for Space Studies.

Research
Functioning as a virtual institute, NExSS is currently composed of sixteen interdisciplinary science teams from ten universities, three NASA centers and two research institutes, who will work together to search for habitable exoplanets that can support life. The US teams were initially selected from a total of about 200 proposals; however, the coalition is expected to expand nationally and internationally as the project gets underway. Teams will also work with amateur citizen scientists who will have the ability to access the public Kepler data and search for exoplanets.

NExSS will draw from scientific expertise in each of the four divisions of the Science Mission Directorate: Earth science, planetary science, heliophysics and astrophysics.  NExSS research will directly contribute to understanding and interpreting future exoplanet data from the upcoming launches of the Transiting Exoplanet Survey Satellite and James Webb Space Telescope, as well as the planned Nancy Grace Roman Space Telescope mission.

Current NExSS research projects as of 2015:

See also

Notes

References

Research institutes in the United States
NASA groups, organizations, and centers
Astrobiology
Astrochemistry
Exoplanetology
Exoplanet search projects